The Suzuki Twin is a kei car built by Suzuki and sold in Japan from January 22, 2003, until October 2005. It was available in both hybrid and non-hybrid versions, making it the first hybrid kei car available in Japan. Under the Japanese test cycle, the standard model was capable of 4.54L/100 km whereas the hybrid variant was capable of 2.93L/100 km. 

Designed primarily for young females, the Suzuki Twin is slightly longer than the Smart Fortwo. It featured many new and unique features including a passenger seat that could fold completely flat and become a storage tray and a single power window on the driver's side to reduce battery use and cut costs.

The Twin's design and concept were first seen in the Suzuki PU3 Commuter concept car at the Tokyo Motor Show. A near-production update was shown at the 2002 Tokyo Motor Show before finally being released in 2003.

In August 2003 motoring magazine Car and Driver test drove the Twin with mostly negative remarks. The Twin's acceleration, storage and interior furnishings were all criticized whilst its headroom and turning diameter were praised.

See also
List of hybrid vehicles

References

Twin
Kei cars
Hybrid electric cars
Front-wheel-drive vehicles
Cars introduced in 2003